Grižane-Belgrad is a village in Primorje-Gorski Kotar County of Croatia. It is located near Crikvenica and Novi Vinodolski. It has a population of 953 (census 2011) and the post code HR-51244.

The modern-day settlement includes the former villages Grižane and Belgrad, and numerous nearby hamlets.

The Grižane Castle overlooks the village.

References

Populated places in Primorje-Gorski Kotar County